Canik is one of the main municipalities in Samsun, Turkey, located at the east of the city center. The municipality had 89,753 inhabitants as of the 2009 census.

Canik means land of Tzan/Can Laz people and became one of the four town municipalities under the patronage of Samsun Metropolitan Municipality in 1994. The region was largely settled by middle and lower working-class people in those days, but recent years made a big impact in the local economy. In 2009, Canik's status changed with other Metropolitan areas Ilkadim, Atakum and Tekkekoy, and it was turned into a borough instead of a small town.

Geography 
It is located on the north, Black Sea coast of Turkey.

References